Poecilothrips is a genus of thrips in the family Phlaeothripidae.

Species
 Poecilothrips albopictus
 Poecilothrips dens
 Poecilothrips nubilus

References

Phlaeothripidae
Thrips
Thrips genera